The Azerbaijan Tower was a planned megatall skyscraper that had been intended to be constructed on the Khazar Islands, 25 km (16 mi) south of Baku, Azerbaijan.

Overview 

The $2 billion tower was to have been the centerpiece of the Khazar Islands, a $100 billion city of 41 artificial islands that was to have spread 3,000 hectares over land reclaimed from the Caspian Sea. The city is being planned to house 1 million residents, contain 150 schools, 50 hospitals and daycare centers, numerous parks, shopping malls, cultural centers, university campuses, and a Formula 1 quality racetrack. All of these facilities are planned to be able to withstand up to magnitude 9.0 earthquakes. The city will be equipped with 150 bridges and a large municipal airport to connect the islands to the mainland.
 
Ibrahim told reporters that American, Turkish, Arab and Chinese investors have already shown their interest in the project that will be, in his words, like a "new Venice".

Construction on the Azerbaijan Tower was planned to begin in 2015 and be completed by around 2019. Later, this construction project was cancelled. The Khazar Islands are scheduled to be finished between 2020 and 2025. But taking into account the scope of the project, some specialists think it will be completed only after 2030.

See also
 Jeddah Tower
 Burj Khalifa
 India Tower

References

External links
 Avesta Concern English Homepage
 Khazar Islands Homepage

Proposed skyscrapers
Towers in Azerbaijan
Proposed buildings and structures in Azerbaijan